Kibriyo Rajabova is a Tajik pop singer. In October 2005, she was granted the "Honoured Worker of Tajikistan" award by Tajikistan President Emomalii Rahmon on the occasion of Tajikistan Culture Day in a ceremony held at Dushanbe headquarters of UNESCO.

References 

21st-century Tajikistani women singers
Living people
Year of birth missing (living people)
Women pop singers